Maria Kirilenko was the defending champion, but chose not to participate.

Ayumi Morita won the title, defeating Elora Dabija in the final, 6–3, 6–1.

Seeds

Main draw

Finals

Top half

Bottom half

References 
 Main draw

Sunfeast - Singles